Dermbach is a municipality in the Wartburgkreis district of Thuringia, Germany. The former municipalities Brunnhartshausen, Diedorf, Neidhartshausen, Stadtlengsfeld, Urnshausen and Zella/Rhön were merged into Dermbach in January 2019.

References

Wartburgkreis